Neoanagraphis chamberlini is a species of liocranid sac spider in the family Liocranidae. It is found in the United States and Mexico.

References

Liocranidae
Articles created by Qbugbot
Spiders described in 1936